is a Japanese singer-songwriter known for his involvement in modern enka. His first name is sometimes spelled .

Biography
Tsuda was born in 1934 in the city of Ichinomiya, Aichi Prefecture under his real name . He graduated from the Gifu Technical High School where he was the leader of an ōendan team. In Osaka, he studied music under the naniwabushi master  (1914-1964) and thence became involved in enka. Tsuda's style came to be influenced by Kawachi ondo.

After 1970, Tsuda studied the music of Soeda Azenbō and made a number of his own recordings of Azenbō's songs.

Selected works
  (1970, LP, Crown Records GW-6023)
  (1979, LP, Crown Records GWA-33)
  (1997, CD, Crown Records CRCN-48501)

References 

1934 births
Living people
Japanese singers
Japanese musicians
People from Aichi Prefecture
Musicians from Aichi Prefecture
Enka singers